Walter Barnett may refer to:

 Henry Walter Barnett (1862–1934), Australian photographer and filmmaker
 Walter Barnett, fictional character from the Transformers Generation 1 series